For the state pageant affiliated with Miss Teen USA, see Miss Idaho Teen USA

The Miss Idaho's Teen competition is the pageant that selects the representative of the U.S. state of Idaho in Miss America's Teen pageant.

Reagan Eubanks of Idaho Falls was crowned Miss Idaho's Outstanding Teen on June 18, 2022 at the Special Event Center in Boise, Idaho. She competed for the title of Miss America's Outstanding Teen 2023 at the Hyatt Regency Dallas in Dallas, Texas on August 12, 2022.

In January of 2023, the official name of the pageant was changed from Miss Idaho’s Outstanding Teen, to Miss Idaho’s Teen, in accordance with the national pageant.

Results summary 
The year in parentheses indicates year of Miss America's Outstanding Teen the award/placement was garnered.

Placements 
 Top 11: Mady Thornquest (2017)
 Top 15: Kaila Yacuk (2020)

Awards

Preliminary awards 
 Preliminary Evening Wear/On-Stage Question: Mady Thornquest (2017)

Non-finalist awards 
 Non-finalist Interview: Ava Powell (2018)

Other awards 
 America's Choice: Kaila Yacuk (2020)
 Outstanding Achievement in Academic Life: Katy Lootens (2011)

Winners

References

External links
 Official website

Idaho
Idaho culture
Women in Idaho
Annual events in Idaho